Ladislav Potměšil (2 September 1945 – 12 July 2021) was a Czech actor.

Selected filmography
  (1970)
  (1978)
 Smrt krásných srnců (1986)
  (1988)
  (1987)
 Dobří holubi se vracejí (1988)
 Jen o rodinných záležitostech (1990)
  (1993, TV)
 Byl jednou jeden polda (1995)
  (2002, TV)
 Bastardi (2010)

TV series 
 Hospoda (1996 - 1997)
 Ordinace v růžové zahradě (2005 - 2008)
  (2014)
 Přístav (2015 - 2017)

References

External links
 
 

  
1945 births
2021 deaths
Czech male film actors
Czech male stage actors
Czech male television actors
20th-century Czech male actors
21st-century Czech male actors
Male actors from Prague
Academy of Performing Arts in Prague alumni